Goldberg station is a railway station in the Goldberg district of the municipality of Böblingen, located in the Böblingen district in Baden-Württemberg, Germany.

References

Stuttgart S-Bahn stations
Railway stations in Baden-Württemberg
Buildings and structures in Böblingen (district)